The University of Santo Tomas Faculty of Arts and Letters, popularly known as "UST Artlets" or "UST AB", is the liberal arts school of the University of Santo Tomas, the oldest and the largest Catholic university in Manila, Philippines.

Established in 1896 with the name Facultad de Filosofía y Letras, following Spanish tradition, the faculty is the first and oldest liberal arts tertiary school in the Philippines. It offers a Bachelor of Arts degree in different areas of Media Studies, Social Sciences and Humanities. It is proclaimed to be a Center of Excellence in Philosophy and a Center of Development in Communication, Literature, and in Journalism by the Commission on Higher Education.

History

The University of Santo Tomas started offering courses in liberal arts and philosophy since its foundation in 1611. These courses were later institutionalized with the establishment of the Faculty of Philosophy and Letters in 1896. A College of Liberal Arts was also established in 1926 which was known for its preparatory courses for Law and Medical schools.

The College of Liberal Arts is divided into Arts and Pure Sciences. The Pure Sciences department has diversified due to scientific advancements in the era and it has developed into the University of Santo Tomas College of Science. Consequently, the College of Liberal Arts merged with the Faculty of Philosophy and Letters in 1964. Thus, modifying the faculty's name into "Arts and Letters".

At the onset, the Faculty offered limited number of programs--Associate in Arts (A.A.), Bachelor of Arts (A.B.), Bachelor of Literature (Litt. B.), and Bachelor of Philosophy (Ph. B.). In the course of time, new courses and majors gradually developed.

In 1971, the Faculty started offering Bachelor of Arts degree programs in Asian Studies, Behavioral Science (originally Liberal Arts-Commerce), Communication Arts, Economics, Journalism, Literature, Philosophy, Political Science, Sociology, and Translation. The A.B. major in Translation was eventually phased out due to lack of enrollment and funding.

In 1994, the Faculty started offering a major in Legal Management, an interdisciplinary degree program in business management and law designed to suit the needs of students intending to go to law school after graduation with intentions to have other career prospects.

In 2002, the Faculty teamed up with the UST College of Education to offer a double degree—Bachelor of Arts-Bachelor of Secondary Education major in Social Sciences/Studies (AB-BSE). The program was discontinued in 2007 because of Philippine government regulations that would stretch the time to complete the AB-BSE degree to at least 5 years and 4 summers.

In June 2011, the Faculty started offering A.B. History and A.B. English Language Studies; and in August 2018, the Faculty started offering A.B. Creative Writing.

Deans
This is an incomplete list.

Student population
The college has approximately 4,000 students, unevenly distributed among thirteen different disciplines.

It offers the third highest number of academic programs in the university, with 13 academic degree programs, next only to the UST Graduate School and the University of Santo Tomas Conservatory of Music.

In recent years, it has been yielding one of the largest number of graduates (approx.750) next only to the University of Santo Tomas Faculty of Engineering and UST College of Commerce and Business Administration and University of Santo Tomas Alfredo M. Velayo College of Accountancy (approx. 800-900 each).

The largest portion of the population in the Faculty of Arts and Letters belongs to the Communication Arts program.

Academic programs
The Faculty currently offers the following four-year academic degree programs. Each academic major has a local student union which is more often referred to as "societies".

The most popular programs, based on the number of students in recent years are Asian Studies, Communication, Journalism, Legal Management, and Political Science'.

Facilities

The college is located in the first and second levels of Saint Raymund de Peñafort Building in the northeastern part of the UST campus, near Dapitan St. (back of UST). The college shares the building with the UST College of Commerce and Business Administration which occupies the third and fourth levels.

The college had a medium-sized auditorium (Jose Rizal Conference Hall) but was transformed into three expandable multimedia rooms, several audio-visual conference rooms, a fully wired computer laboratory, a student activity center, a faculty hall, fully air-conditioned classrooms, free wi-fi access, and photocopying machines.

Research centers
The college is affiliated with the following research institutes:

University of Santo Tomas Center for Creative Writing and Literary Studies - a special academic unit run by literature professors and active writers (poets, essayists, and novelists) in the country and abroad. The center conducts literary workshops for a select group of literary enthusiasts, dubbed as Fellows. The Thomasian Writers Guild (TWG) is an independent association of U.S.T. students, faculty and alumni who are actively engaged in the literary field. Members frequently run or at least participate in the projects of the center.

UST Benavides Library
Among its many departments, the Miguel de Benavides Library has nine departments which suit the academic requirements of the college:

Humanities Section - books on world literature and philosophy.
Languages Section - books on languages, linguistics, and speech communication.
Filipiniana Section - books on economics, history, arts, culture, literature, etc. that was published in the Philippines.
Civil Law Section - books on laws and jurisprudence.
Social Sciences Section - books on history, education, economics, political science, psychology etc.
Asian Studies Section - books on Asian history, geography, politics, society, etc.
Religion Section - books on religion and philosophy.
Periodicals Section - hard copies of major newspapers and magazines from the pre-war period up to the present.
General References Section - encyclopedias, dictionaries, atlases, almanacs, etc.
Educational Technology Center (Ed-Tech Center) - supervises the Tomcat, a student-run cable television network. The center has mini-theatres, audio-visual rooms, and an archive of important films, television documentaries, and audio-CDs.

The library also has conference rooms readily available and free-of-charge to students and faculty upon prior reservation.

Faculty of Arts and Letters Student Council

The Faculty of Arts and Letters Student Council (referred to as ABSC for brevity) - is the primary student governing body of all bonafide students of the Faculty of Arts and Letters. It is currently divided into two bodies, namely, the executive board, and the Board of Majors. The executive board is composed of the seven faculty-wide elective officers (President, Vice President for External Affairs, Vice President for Internal Affairs, Secretary, Treasurer, Auditor, and Public Relations Officer), and the Board of Majors, colloquially referred to as "Bom", which exercises quasi-legislative and quasi-judicial powers, is composed of the highest executive officer of each existing academic society in the faculty. The ABSC Constitution provides for a need to have a Speaker in the Board of Majors. Current initiatives of the Board of Majors include the de facto Deputy Speaker and Secretary.

The contemporary ABSC can trace its roots from the Pax Romana which exercises the functions of a student forum in the university during the Martial Law period in the Philippines under the dictatorship of President Ferdinand E. Marcos. A student council was already in operation when the Marcos administration discouraged the formation of student councils. The former AB Student Council ceased operations. Although, to further put into realization in the context of academic and social liberty as students of the premiere liberal arts college of the University of Santo Tomas, academic societies were founded in the 1970s and are still existing today and are older than many student councils. However, no academic society in the faculty held the specific term "Student Council" and there was no unifying student council for all students of Arts and Letters back then.

Malacañang heard of the students' initiative to create a faculty-wide AB Student Council and summoned its supposed founder into the Palace, Reynaldo Lopez, then President of the Pax Romana, to defend the rationale behind the creation of the student council in front of President Marcos himself. Creation of such organization is something which was not allowed during the era of dictatorship for it might trigger radical ideas and initiate revolt against the idea of a "new society" which Marcos forcefully inculcates the nation with. Through the efforts of this new breed of student leaders, the ABSC was founded as the first student council of its kind in the country, in the year 1980, exercising autonomy and executive powers from the mandate vested upon the council officers by the students of the faculty. The founder, Reynaldo Lopez, became the first vice president, and Ronald Llamas, a member of President Benigno "Noynoy" Aquino's cabinet, served as the first president of the student council.

The ABSC President, along with other presidents of college and faculty student councils create the legislative branch of the university-wide Central Student Council (which was also reinstituted by ABSC pillar Reynaldo Lopez). They are known as the UST CSC Central Board and they are the counterpart of the more popular executory branch of the Central Student Council, UST CSC Executive Board, who are elected via university-wide voting. Student council elections are held during the last few weeks of the school year. However, it was not until 1991, under the presidency of Angelito Villanueva, that this practice came into surface. Villanueva was the first ABSC President to serve for two academic years (1990-1992), a feat followed during the UST Quadricentennial Celebration by Julius Fernandez (2011-2013) who initiated the Quasquicentennial celebration of the faculty. Aside from contributing to university-wide changes, the ABSC is known to lead the portion of Thomasian students who are serving as the front liners in rallies and causes, events of national essence and socio-political gatherings inside or outside the university.

Aside from Atty. Reynaldo Lopez, Sec. Ronald Llamas, Lito Villanueva, Chito Maniago and Jeffrey Espiritu, many alumni of the AB Student Council - both members of the executive board and the Board of Majors, are now successful names in their chosen profession. More than the positions ascribed unto them by their respective offices, the experience acquired in the highest governing body of the most active studentry in the campus helps in educating themselves as they graduate.

Other Student organizations
The college is home to various student organizations.

Student regulatory bodies:
Commission on Elections (AB COMELEC) - the official student elections authority of the college.

Student publications:
The Flame - the official student publication of the college, which has produced internationally acclaimed journalists and award-winning writers.
Dapitan - the award-winning literary folio of The Flame, named after Dapitan St., running at the north side of the college.

Student academic organizations:

UST Artlets Economics Society (AES) - the official student organization of Economics majors; the Artlets is used a prefix to distinguish the group from the UST Economics Society, the organization of Economics majors in the UST College of Commerce and Business Administration.
UST Asian Studies Society (ASSoc) - the official student organization of Asian Studies majors.
UST Behavioral Science Society (BESSoc)- the official student organization of Behavioral Science majors.
UST Communication Arts Students Association (CASA) - the official student organization of Communication Arts majors. They are a founding member of the Metro Manila Alliance of Communication Students, a federation of mass media academic organizations from different colleges and universities in Metro Manila. Also, it is an active partner of the Philippine Association of Communication Educators (PACE), an organization composed by many mass media professionals from all parts of the country. This society has the most number of guilds in the Faculty, namely: the CASA Cam, Reel, Rhetoric, MusiCASA, Footworks, Channel, Stage Talents, Ad-venture and Chronicle.
The UST Journalism Society (UST JRNSOC) - The UST Journalism Society is the official student organization of Southeast Asia's oldest journalism school—the UST Journalism School. In upholding its fine tradition as a Center of Development in journalism, the UST Journalism Society commits its mission into molding Thomasian journalists to become good natured and flexible reporters in the field of broadcast, print, and online media. The UST Journalism Society is also the founding member of the Talamitam Network of Schools, the organization forged by six journalism schools in the Philippines to promote community journalism in the country. 
UST English Language Studies Society (ELSSoc) - the official student organization of English Language Studies majors.
UST History Society (USTHSTSOC) - founded in 2011, it is the official student organization of History majors.
UST Legal Management Society (LM Soc) - the official student organization of Legal Management majors. The group is a founding member of the Philippine Alliance of Legal Management Societies (PALMS), a federation of legal management societies in different colleges and universities in the country. Also, LM Soc is a founding member of the Alliance of Legal Management Associations of the Philippines, Inc. (ALMAP, Inc.), the existing alliance of different schools from Luzon to Visayas proffering Legal Management as a discipline. In March 2001, LM Soc produced most of the year's academic and leadership awardees, including the top three graduates in the entire college.
UST Literary Society (LitSoc) - the official student organization of Literature majors.
UST Philosophy Council or Concilium Philosophiae - the official student organization of Philosophy majors. In 1998, the group started recruiting members from outside the Philosophy Department. The purpose is to promote philosophy and debate as an interesting discipline even to non-philosophy students.
The Political Science Forum (TPSF) - the official student organization of Political Science majors, and currently the sole Political Science student-organization of the University of Santo Tomas. It serves as the bulwark of Political education and awareness in the Faculty and the university. It is affiliated with APSOP (Association of Political Science Organizations of the Philippines), a number of other organizations, and its faculty are members and officers of the PPSA (Philippine Political Science Association). The Political Science Society, its forerunner, was founded in 1980 by the batch of Atty. Reynaldo Lopez, who also co-founded the AB Student Council. In 1991, it was turned into The Political Science Forum, and in 1992 its Constitution was drafted by a Commission, part of which are Political Analyst Edmund Tayao, and Prof. Reynald Trillana who are AB Faculty Members.
UST Sociological Society (USTSS) - the official student organization of Sociology majors.

Special interest groups:
Artistang Artlets (AA) - the official theater organization of the Faculty; founded in 1980 by Marie Luz Datu and nick galvez of the Philippine Educational Theater Association
UST Chorus of Arts and Letters (AB Chorale/ABC) - the official student choral group of the college; competes with the choral groups of the other colleges of the university in the annual Himig Tomasino; officially founded in 1995 by Ophelia Dimalanta.
BA Dauncen - the official dance troupe of the Faculty; successor of the defunct Dance Synergy.
AB Debate Parliament (ABDP) - the official debate organization of the Faculty of Arts and Letters. The AB team won the Dialectics Debate Competition, the competition sponsored by the Thomasian Debaters Council, in 2008.
AB International Youth Council (AB IYC)
AB Knighted Owls (AVA) - official drum line organization of the Faculty; seeking OSA recognition since its institutionalization as a committee of the ABSC in 2011.
Artlets Basketball Team - the official student basketball team of the college; competes with other colleges in intramural games.
Artlets Volleyball Team - the official student volleyball team of the college; competes with other colleges in intramural games.
AB Pautakan Team - the official student quiz team of the college; competes in the annual university-wide Pautakan Quiz Competition sponsored by The Varsitarian, the oldest university-wide student publication in the Philippines. The AB team reigned as Pautakan grand champions in 1979, 1989, from 2002 to 2006, and 2009 beating all competing colleges across diverse fields of medicine, engineering, architecture, education, commerce, etc.
AB Pax Romana- college based unit of the Central Pax Romana, the university's official Religious Organization.
AB Football Club (ABFC)- the official student football team of the college; aside from competing with the other colleges and faculties in the university, this team also competes with tournaments outside the campus.

Student political parties:
DEKADA - the second oldest political party in the college; formerly referred to as "Dekada Nobenta" because of its foundation in December 2 of the year 1992; affiliated with the AKLAS (Alyansa ng Kristiyanong Lakas) Central Political Party.
Grand Alliance for Progress (GAP)- the first political party in the college to be established after the year 2000. During its early existence, GAP actively participated in the second People Power Revolution that toppled the regime of President Joseph Estrada. Also a pioneer member of the LTC, but pulled out their affiliation in 2006.
Students' Democratic Party (SDP)- the oldest student political party in the Philippines; established on June 12, 1981, during the Ferdinand Marcos regime; one of the student political parties that established the Lakas Tomasino Coalition (LTC), a university wide political party. SDP is still an affiliate party of the said coalition and is the ruling party in terms of number of Executive Board Officers since School Year 2009.
Student Alliance for the Advancement of Democratic Rights in UST (STAND-UST)- the newest political party, it was founded in 2015.

Prominent alumni 

Some of the college's notable alumni (graduates and former students), in alphabetical order:

Academe 
Alfredo Co – Filipino philosopher; Post-doctoral Fellow in Philosophy, Sorbonne University of Paris and the Chinese University of Hong Kong; author of the 7 volume Philosophical Silk Road, 2009; chair of CHED Technical Panel for Philosophy; Visiting professor in the leading Departments of Philosophy in Europe, North America and Asia; Full Professor of Philosophy, University of Santo Tomas; President, Philippine Academy of Philosophical Research
Richard Ang - Filipino divinity scholar; 97th Rector Magnificus of the University of Santo Tomas
Ophelia Alcantara Dimalanta – S.E.A. Write Awardee; former executive director, UST Center for Creative Writing and Studies; former Dean, UST Faculty of Arts and Letters; textbook author; literary critic
Liza Lopez-Rosario - inaugural dean of the University of Santo Tomas Graduate School of Law
Cristina Pantoja-Hidalgo – former vice president for Public Affairs, University of the Philippines System; former Director, UP Institute of Creative Writing, current Director UST Center for Creative Writing and Literary Studies (CCWLS)
Bienvenido Lumbera – Professor, School of Humanities, Ateneo de Manila University, Professor Emeritus, UP College of Arts and Letters; Professor of Literature and Creative Writing, De La Salle University-Manila College of Liberal Arts; co-founder, Bienvenido N. Santos Creative Writing and Research Center, DLSU-Manila
Ponciano Pineda – former chairman, National Commission on the Filipino Language; Editor-in-Chief, Diksyunaryo ng Wikang Filipino
Alejandro Roces – President, CAP College Foundation; former Secretary of Education; columnist, The Philippine Star
Reynaldo Lopez- Law Professor; Assistant Dean, Arellano University School of Law

Business 
Henry Tenedero – GoNegosyo mentor; professor; entrepreneur; motivational speaker
Jeffrey Tarayao – President, One Meralco Foundation, Chief Corporate Social Responsibility Officer of Meralco; Grand Anvil Awardee

Media 
Bong Osorio - Vice President for Corporate Communications, ABS-CBN
Crispin Maslog - communication educator
Sandra Aguinaldo – investigative reporter and field correspondent, GMA Network; 2008 Silver Screen Awardee, US International Film & Video Festival; 2008 Silver Medalist, New York Festivals
Arnold Clavio – newscaster and public affairs host, GMA Network; 2008 Silver Screen Awardee, US International Film & Video Festival; 2008 Bronze Medalist and UNDP Special Awardee, New York Festivals
Ali Sotto – newscaster and public affairs host, ABC-5; radio program host, DZBB; television and film actress
Gil Portes – film director
Bernardo Bernardo – stage, TV and film actor; Best Actor Urian Awards (Ishmael Bernal's Manila by Night); singer, writer, director, comedian; Tagalog lecturer, University of California Riverside
Winnie Cordero (Rowena Cordero) – main cast at Sine Skwela, Batibot, Magandang Umaga Pilipinas and Umagang Kay Ganda; television and film actress; television host at ABS-CBN; 2005 & 2006 Golden Dove Awardee for Best Variety Radio Program Host
Faye Martel – television producer, actress, and professor; executive producer of Artista Academy; founding chairperson of the Tiger Media Network
Lourd Ernest de Veyra – songwriter and lead vocalist of rock band Radioactive Sago Project; member, Artists for the Removal of Gloria (ARREST Gloria)
Johnny Delgado – film, television and stage actor; drama instructor, Asia Pacific Film Institute
Jun Lana – playwright, screenwriter and director
Wado Siman - celebrity chef
Frank Lloyd Mamaril - entertainment director
Gretchen Malalad – field reporter, ABS-CBN; former housemate, Pinoy Big Brother: Celebrity Edition; Southeast Asian Games gold medalist for Karate
Piolo Pascual – actor, singer, and commercial model, honorary member, Teatro Tomasino
Eula Valdez – television and film actress; commercial model
Jennifer Sevilla – movie and television actress; member of That's Entertainment
John Manalo – movie and television actor; FAMAS and Star Awards Best Child Actor;

 Government and diplomatic affairs 
Alice Bulos - former commissioner of the United States Federal Council on the Aging, appointed by Bill Clinton 
Guiller Asido – chief administrator of the Intramuros Administration; former Corporate Secretary and Legal Counsel, Philippine Tourism Authority
Alfredo Benipayo – former court administrator of the Philippine Supreme Court; Commission on Elections Chairman; Solicitor General; and current Dean of the UST Faculty of Civil Law
Harriet Demetriou – former Commission on Elections Chairperson, Sandiganbayan Associate Justice
Susan Ople - first Secretary of the Department of Migrant Workers
Andres Narvasa – former Supreme Court Chief Justice; Chairman of the Preparatory Commission for Constitutional Reform
Francisco Tatad – former Philippine Senator and Minister of Public Information
Ramon Paul Hernando - Associate Justice of the Supreme Court of the Philippines
Rosalinda Asuncion Vicente – Associate Justice, Philippine Court of Appeals
Victor Ziga – former Philippine Senator

 History and historical figures 
Jose Rizal – the National Hero of the Philippines; author, Noli Me Tangere, El Filibusterismo, and Mi Ultimo Adios.
Gregorio F. Zaide – history professor; author, History of Asian Nations; former president, Philippine Historical Association

 Literature 
Alejandro Abadilla – Carlos Palanca Awardee for Literature; Founder, Kapisanang BalagtasRoberto T. Añonuevo – Hall of Fame, Don Carlos Palanca Memorial Awards for Literature
Teo Antonio – renowned poet
Cirilo F. Bautista – Literary contributor, Panorama Lifestyle Magazine; renowned poet, fictionist, critic and writer of nonfiction
Jose Wendell Capili – Carlos Palanca Awardee for Literature
Lourd Ernest de Veyra – poet, songwriter, member, Artists for the Removal of Gloria (ARREST Gloria)
Eric Gamalinda – renowned poet
J. Neil Garcia – renowned poet and literary critic; director, UP Press
Avelina Gil - writer
Amado V. Hernandez – renowned poet, journalist, novelist, playwright
Cristina Pantoja-Hidalgo – former executive director, UP Institute for Creative Writing; Carlos Palanca Awardee for Literature; former Dean, UP College of Arts and Letters; former Director, UP Press
Nick Joaquin – National Artist for Literature
F. Sionil Jose – National Artist for Literature; Ramon Magsaysay Awardee
Bienvenido Lumbera – National Artist for Literature; Ramon Magsaysay Awardee
Jose Villa Panganiban – Commissioner on Filipino Language; Editor-in-Chief, Diksyunaryo-Tesauro Pilipino-InglesPonciano Pineda – Carlos Palanca Awardee for Literature; chairman, National Commission on the Filipino Language; Editor-in-Chief, Diksyunaryo ng Wikang FilipinoRogelio R. Sikat – Carlos Palanca Awardee for Literature; fictionist, playwright, translator and educator.
Rolando Tinio – renowned poet, director, actor, critic, essayist and educator

 Publishing 
Eugenia Duran Apostol – Founder, Philippine Daily Inquirer; first recipient, UP Gawad Plaridel (highest individual media award); Ramon Magsaysay Awardee for Journalism
Teodoro Benigno (Teddy Benigno) – journalist; chief speechwriter of President Corazon Aquino
Cirilo F. Bautista – literary contributor, Panorama Lifestyle Magazine
Rina Jimenez-David – columnist, The Philippine Daily Inquirer and Sunday Inquirer MagazineLourd Ernest de Veyra – journalist; lead vocalist of rock band Radioactive Sago Project Society, fashion, and culture 
Rosemarie Arenas (Baby Arenas) – philanthropist, socialite, concert producer
Evangeline Pascual – Miss Republic of the Philippines 1973; Miss World 1973 1st Runner-up; television and film actress
Joanne Quintas-Primero – Binibining Pilipinas-Universe 1995; Miss Universe 1995 11th placer (preliminary round); Miss Tourism International 1997; television and film actress
Daisy Reyes – Binibining Pilipinas-World 1996; Miss Personality of the World 1996; Miss Expo International 1997 4th Runner-up; entrepreneur

 Socio-civic affairs and public advocacy 
Eugenia Duran Apostol – founder, Foundation for Worldwide People Power; one of 65 Great Asian Heroes, Time Magazine (Nov. 2006)
Lourd Ernest de Veyra – member, Artists for the Removal of Gloria (ARREST Gloria); lead vocalist, Radioactive Sago Project''

See also
University of Santo Tomas

References

Broadcasting schools
Educational institutions established in 1896
Journalism schools in Asia
Public policy schools
Public administration schools
Arts and Letters
Liberal arts colleges in the Philippines
Philippine journalism organizations
1896 establishments in the Philippines